Odesa Oblast, also referred to as Odeshchyna is an oblast (province) of southwestern Ukraine, located along the northern coast of the Black Sea. Its administrative centre is the city of Odesa. Population: 

The region has eight seaports and five of the biggest lakes, including Yalpuh Lake, in Ukraine.

History
Evidence of the earliest inhabitants in this area comes from the settlements and burial grounds of the Neolithic  Gumelniţa,  Cucuteni-Trypillia and Usatove cultures, as well as from the tumuli and hoards of the Bronze Age Proto-Indo-Europeans. In the 1st millennium B.C.  Milesian Greeks founded colonies along the northern coast of the Black Sea, including the towns of Olbia, Tyras, Niconium, Panticapaeum, and  Chersonesus. The Greeks left behind painted vessels, ceramics, sculptures, inscriptions, arts and crafts that indicate the prosperity of their ancient civilisation.

The culture of Scythian tribes inhabiting the Black Sea littoral steppes in the first millennium B.C. has left artefacts in settlements and burial grounds, including weapons, bronze cauldrons, other utensils, and adornments. By the beginning of the 1st millennium A.D. the Sarmatians displaced the Scythians. In the 3rd–4th centuries A.D. a tribal alliance, represented by the items of Chernyakhov culture, developed. From the middle of the first millennium the formation of the  Slavic people began. In the 9th century the eastern Slavs united into a state with Kyiv as its centre. The Khazars, Polovtsy and Pechenegs were the Slavs' neighbours during different times. Archeological evidence of the period of the 9th–14th centuries survives in materials from the settlements and cities of Kievan Rus': Belgorod, Caffa- Theodosia, and Berezan Island.

The  Mongols took over the Black Sea littoral in the 13th century.

From about 1290 parts of the region were territories of the Republic of Genoa, becoming a center of Genoese commercial activity until at least the middle of the 14th century.

The Grand Duchy of Lithuania acquired the area at the beginning of the 15th century.

In 1593 the Ottoman Empire set up in the area what became known as its Dnieper Province (Özü Eyalet), unofficially known as the Khanate of Ukraine.
Russian historiography refers to the area from 1791 as the Ochakov Oblast.
The territory of the Odesa Oblast passed to Russian control in 1791 in the course of the Russian southern expansion towards the Black Sea at the end of the 18th century.

After the February Revolution of 1917 in Russia the area became part of the Ukrainian People's Republic (1917–1918), but soon succumbed first to the Russian Volunteer Army (part of the White movement) and then to the Russian Bolshevik Red Army. By 1920 the Soviet authorities had secured the territory of Odesa Oblast, which became part of the Ukrainian SSR. The oblast was established on 27 February 1932 from five districts: Odesa Okruha, Pervomaisk Okruha, Kirovohrad Okruha, Mykolaiv Okruha, and Kherson Okruha.

In 1937 the  Central Executive Committee of the USSR split off the eastern portions of the Odesa Oblast to form the Mykolaiv Oblast.

During World War II  Axis forces conquered the area and  Romania occupied the oblast and administered it as part of the Transnistria Governorate (1941–1944). After the war the Soviet administration reestablished the oblast with its pre-war borders.

Odesa Oblast expanded in 1954 to absorb Izmail Oblast (also known as the Budjak region of Bessarabia), formed in 1940 as a result of the Soviet occupation of Bessarabia and Northern Bukovina (from  Romania), when Northern and Southern parts of Bessarabia were given to the Ukrainian SSR.

During the 1991 referendum, 85.38% of votes in Odesa Oblast favored the Declaration of Independence of Ukraine. A survey conducted in December 2014 by the Kyiv International Institute of Sociology found that 2.3% of the oblast's population supported their region joining Russia, 91.5% did not support the idea, and the rest were undecided or did not respond. A poll reported by Alexei Navalny and conducted in September 2014 found similar results.

On 4-5 July 2022 during international Ukraine Recovery Conference (URC 2022) in Lugano Switzerland pledged to support the rebuilding of Odesa region.

Geography

It is characterised by largely flat steppes – part of the Black Sea Lowland – divided by the estuary of the Dniester river, and bordered to the south by the Danube. Its Black Sea coast has numerous sandy beaches, estuaries and lagoons. The region's soils (especially chernozems) have a reputation for fertility, and intensive agriculture is the mainstay of the local rural economy. The southwest has many orchards and vineyards, while arable crops grow throughout the region.

Points of interest

 Odesa Opera
 Akkerman fortress
 Potemkin Stairs

Economy

Significant branches of the oblast's economy are:
 oil refining and chemicals processing
 transportation (important sea and river ports, oil pipelines and railway);
 viticulture and other forms of agriculture, notably the growing of wheat, maize, barley, sunflowers and sugar beets.

The region's industrial capability is principally concentrated in and around Odesa.

Demographics

The oblast's population (as at the start of 2021) was 2,368,107 people, nearly 43% of whom lived in the city of Odesa.

Significant Bulgarian (6.1%) and Romanian (5.0%) minorities reside in the province. It has the highest proportion of Jews of any oblast in Ukraine (although smaller than the Autonomous City of Kyiv) and there is a small Greek community in the city of Odesa.

Bulgarians and Romanians represent 21% and 13% respectively, of the population in the salient of Budjak, within Odesa Oblast.

Age structure
 0–14 years: 15.5%  (male 188,937/female 179,536)
 15–64 years: 70.7%  (male 812,411/female 867,706)
 65 years and over: 14.0%  (male 116,702/female 218,808) (2013 official)

Median age
 total: 38.4 years 
 male: 35.4 years 
 female: 41.5 years  (2013 official)

Religion

The dominant religion in Odesa Oblast is Eastern Orthodox Christianity, professed by 84% of the population. Another 8% declares to be non-religious and 6% are unaffiliated generic Christians. Adherents of Catholicism and Protestantism make up 0.5% of the population respectively.

The Orthodox community of Odesa Oblast is divided as follows:
 Non-denominational – 46%
 Ukrainian Orthodox Church of the Moscow Patriarchate – 31%
 Ukrainian Orthodox Church of the Kyivan Patriarchate – 21%
 Ukrainian Autocephalous Orthodox Church – 1%
 Unknown – 1%

Administrative divisions

Until 2020, the Odesa Oblast was administratively subdivided into 26 raions (districts) and 7 municipalities which were directly subordinate to the oblast government – (Bilhorod-Dnistrovskyi, Chornomorsk, Izmail, Podilsk, Teplodar, Yuzhne and the administrative centre of the oblast, Odesa). 

Note: An asterisk (^) indicates the two municipalities and nine raions which previously constituted Izmail Oblast until that former oblast's merger with Odesa Oblast on 15 February 1954; these areas lie to the west of the Dniester River, and formerly constituted the territory known as the Budjak (southern Bessarabia). In the 18 July 2020 reorganisation, these nine raions were reduced to three, which also incorporated the two former independent cities.
Note: Asterisks (*) Though the administrative center of the rayon is housed in the city/town that it is named after, cities do not answer to the rayon authorities only towns do; instead they are directly subordinated to the oblast government and therefore are not counted as part of rayon statistics.

On 18 July 2020, the number of districts (raions) was reduced to seven, now also incorporating the formerly independent cities. (see map). They are now divided into 91 municipalities (hromadas).

Notable people
One of the most famous Odesits is Sergei Utochkin who was a universal sportsman excelling in cycling, boxing, swimming and played football for the Odesa British Athletic Club. Utochkin had challenged a steam-powered tram while running, on a bicycle he beat a galloping horse, while on roller skates he was passing a bicyclist. The next stage for him was to conquest skies. Utochkin managed to buy an airplane from a local banker and completed dozens of exhibition flights. Eventually, he managed to assemble his own Farman-type airplane. In Kyiv, Utochkin was demonstrating his piloting skills in front of some 50,000 people, among which was a future creator of helicopters Igor Sikorsky.

A number of other notable people were born in Odesa, including the poet Anna Akhmatova, former NASA scientist Nicholas E. Golovin who worked with the Apollo program, composer Tamara Maliukova Sidorenko, and the founder of jazz in the Soviet Union Leonid Utyosov.

See also
 Subdivisions of Ukraine
 Kherson Governorate
 Budjak
 Transnistria
 Gagauzia
 Bessarabia
 Moldova
 Romania
 Ukraine
 Black Sea
 USSR

References

External links

 Odesa regional administration homepage

Oblasts of Ukraine
Bessarabia
States and territories established in 1932
1932 establishments in Ukraine